Anastasija Ročāne (born 7 June 1992) is a Latvian footballer who plays as a defender and has appeared for the Latvia women's national team.

Career
Ročāne has been capped for the Latvia national team, appearing for the team during the 2019 FIFA Women's World Cup qualifying cycle.

References

External links
 
 
 

1992 births
Living people
Latvian women's footballers
Women's association football defenders
Gintra Universitetas players
Rīgas FS players
Latvia women's youth international footballers
Latvia women's international footballers